The 2012–13 season was Ergotelis' 83rd season in existence and first season in the Football League after the club's latest relegation from the Super League. Ergotelis also participated in the Greek cup, entering the competition in the First Round. Despite the club facing one of its most challenging seasons to date, with many of the club's veterans being either released or refusing to follow the team in a lower division, and major shareholders announcing they were stepping down during mid-season, the team managed to secure instant promotion in the Super League, after finishing in second place. This marked the third promotion of the club to the Super League in a period of nine years.

Players

The following players have departed in mid-season 

Note: Flags indicate national team as has been defined under FIFA eligibility rules. Players and Managers may hold more than one non-FIFA nationality.

Transfers

In

Promoted from youth system

Total spending:  0.000 €

Out 
 
Total income:  150.000 €

Expenditure:   150.000 €

Managerial changes

Pre-season and friendlies

Pre-season friendlies

Mid-season friendlies

Competitions

Overview 

Last updated: 15 July 2014

Football League Greece

League table

Results summary

Matches

Greek Cup

Statistics

Goal scorers

Last updated: 22 July 2014

References

Ergotelis
Ergotelis F.C. seasons